Mora Club de Fútbol is a football team based in Mora in the autonomous community of Castilla-La Mancha. Founded in 1977, it plays in the Primera Autonómica Preferente – Group 2. Its stadium is Municipal Las Delicias with a capacity of 600 seats.

History 
The history of football in the town of Mora started at the end of the 1920s. At that time friendly matches were played against teams from neighboring towns.

Season to season

10 seasons in Tercera División

Notable players
 Soumaïla Konaré

References

External links
Official website 
ffcm.es profile

Football clubs in Castilla–La Mancha
Association football clubs established in 1977
1977 establishments in Spain
Province of Toledo